Andrea Strnadová (born on 28 May 1972) is a retired tennis player from the Czech Republic. She is married to Australian former tennis player Jason Stoltenberg.

Strnadová was awarded the WTA Most Impressive Newcomer in 1991.

WTA career finals

Singles: 5 (5 runner-ups)

Doubles: 6 (3 titles, 3 runner-ups)

ITF Circuit finals

Singles (4–0)

Doubles (2–2)

References

External links
 
 
 

Living people
1972 births
Australian Open (tennis) junior champions
Czech female tennis players
Wimbledon junior champions
Grand Slam (tennis) champions in girls' singles
Grand Slam (tennis) champions in girls' doubles
Czechoslovak female tennis players
Tennis players from Prague